Strom Products Ltd. was an American food manufacturer in Bannockburn, Illinois, best known for its "No Yolks" brand of cholesterol-free noodles made without egg yolks. Strom Products was acquired by Ebro Foods under its New World Pasta subsidiary in 2012.

References

External links
Official site

Food and drink companies of the United States
Companies based in Lake County, Illinois